The 2007 Brown Bears football team was an American football team that represented Brown University during the 2007 NCAA Division I FCS football season. Brown finished third in the Ivy League. Brown averaged 5,138 fans per game.

In their 10th season under head coach Phil Estes, the Bears compiled a 5–5 record and outscored opponents 312 to 291. Eric Brewer, Dereck Knight and A.J. Tracey were the team captains. 

The Bears' 4–3 conference record placed third in the Ivy League standings. They outscored Ivy opponents 205 to 177. 

Brown played its home games at Brown Stadium in Providence, Rhode Island.

Schedule

References

Brown
Brown Bears football seasons
Brown Bears football